On 25 November 2019, two French military helicopters, part of Operation Barkhane, crashed in northern Mali, killing 13 soldiers. It was the deadliest incident involving the French military since the 1983 Beirut barracks bombings.

Crash 
A French Eurocopter Tiger attack helicopter collided with a Eurocopter AS532 Cougar military transport helicopter at low-altitude at night while on a sortie near the town of Ménaka in Northern Mali. The helicopters were in the midst of pursuing militants on vehicles and motor-bikes, after ground forces had called in for air support. For unknown reasons, the two helicopters collided and crashed killing all onboard.

Casualties 
Six officers and a master corporal were among the 13 fatalities. One of those killed, Pierre-Emmanuel Bockel, was the son of French Senator Jean-Marie Bockel. Bockel was the pilot of the 'Cougar' helicopter.

References 

  
2019 in Mali
2019 disasters in Africa
Accidents and incidents involving helicopters
Aviation accidents and incidents in 2019
Aviation accidents and incidents in Mali
2019 helicopter crash
Mid-air collisions
Aviation accidents and incidents in Africa
Mid-air collisions involving helicopters
Mid-air collisions involving military aircraft
Mali War
November 2019 events in Africa